The 8 inch (203 mm) M110 self-propelled howitzer is an American-made self-propelled artillery system consisting of an M115 203 mm howitzer installed on a purpose-built chassis. Before its retirement from US service, it was the largest available self-propelled howitzer in the United States Army's inventory; it continues in service with the armed forces of other countries, to which it was exported. Missions include general support, counter-battery fire, and suppression of enemy air defense systems.

Description
According to the operator's manual, the M110's typical rate of fire was three rounds per two minutes when operated at maximum speed, and one round per two minutes with sustained fire. The M110 featured a hydraulically operated rammer to automatically chamber the 200+ pound projectile. These rammers were prone to breakdown and generally slowed operation of the gun because the rammers required crews to completely lower the massive barrel before using it. Well trained and motivated crews could achieve two to four rounds per minute for short periods by using the manual rammer, essentially a heavy steel pole with a hard rubber pad on one end. Using the manual rammer was physically demanding, but crews were not required to lower the barrels as much as with the hydraulic rammer.

History
The M110 howitzer first entered service with the U.S. Army in 1963 and was used in the Vietnam War by the United States Army. Later versions were used in the Gulf War - Operation Desert Shield and Operation Desert Storm by Tango Battery 5th Battalion 11th Marines, and the British Army's 32nd Regiment Royal Artillery.

In 1977 the upgraded M110A1 entered service, featuring a longer M201 series barrel which gave an increased range. The M110A2 is the latest version with a double muzzle brake, in contrast to the earlier A1 version which had a plain muzzle. The 2nd Battalion 18th Field Artillery (U.S. Army) which deactivated in 1994 at Fort Sill, Oklahoma, and the 5th Battalion 18th Field Artillery served in Desert Storm with the M110A2 Howitzer, as well as the 142nd Field Artillery Brigade (Arkansas Army National Guard), and 1st BN 181 Field Artillery (Tennessee Army National Guard). Most of the U.S. Army and USMC relied on the M109 series 155-millimeter howitzer gun systems during this conflict; sending remaining M110s to reserve or National Guard units. These units then took possession of M109s as they returned from service in the Gulf. M110s were still in service with the 3/92 FA (USAR) and running fire missions at Camp Atterbury as late as the summer of 1994.

The howitzer has been retired from U.S. Army service having been replaced by the M270 Multiple Launch Rocket System.

The M110A2s were made from refitted M110s or M107 175 mm SP guns

At the end of the Cold War under U.S. Division Plan 86, all armored and mechanized infantry divisions included a battalion of heavy artillery that included two batteries of M110A2 SP howitzers with six guns each for a total of 12 guns, plus one battery of nine M270 Multiple Launch Rocket System rocket artillery. 

Israel used M110s along with M107s during Yom Kippur War against Egyptian and Syrian forces. Again in 1982 Operation Peace for Galilee, Israel used M110 systems against PLO and Lebanese allies with deadly effect during Siege of Beirut.

Iran used its M110s during Iran–Iraq War against Iraqi forces during its offensives against Iraq.

Turkish Armed Forces have used M110A2 systems against Kurdistan Workers' Party since the 1990s and during Turkish military intervention in Syria, mainly against People's Protection Units.

Projectiles

 M14 dummy
 M106 HE
 M650 HE rocket assist projectile (RAP)
 M509 ICM
 M404 ICM anti-personnel (airburst)
 M426 agent GB Sarin
 M422A1 Artillery Fired Atomic Projectile
 M424 High Altitude Spotting Round for the M422 projectile
 XM753 Atomic RA (rocket assisted)

Operators

Current operators
: Royal Bahraini Army 13 as M110A2 from Netherlands delivered in 1994, 25 as M110A2 from US delivered in 1996.
: Hellenic Army 145 as M110A2.
: Egyptian Army Received 144 as M110A2 as aid in 1996.
: Iran Army 30 M110.
: Japan Ground Self-Defense Force 91 as M110A2.
: Jordanian Armed Forces 120 as M110A2.
: Moroccan Army 60 as M110A2.
: Pakistan Army 140 in service as of 2021.
: Republic of China Army 60 as M110A2.
: Turkish Army currently phasing out 219 as M110A2 in favor of T-155 Fırtına

Former operators
: Belgian Army 11 M110A2 between 1972 and 1993 used by the 20th Artillery Regiment (Belgian Forces in Germany).
: German Army M110A2 until 1993.
: Israeli Army 36 as M110, retired in 1990s.
: Italian Army used M110A2s, phased out by 1998.
: Republic of Korea Army Operated M110 since 1961. Retired in the late 2000s after being replaced by K9 Thunder.
: Army of the Republic of Vietnam.
: Royal Netherlands Army M110A1 and M110A2, replaced by the M109 in the 1990s
: Spanish Army as 64 M110A2, deployed in divisional fire support regiments until 2009.
: British Army as M110A2 firing high explosive and nuclear shells only. (The FV433 Abbot SPG, the M109A2, and the M110A1 were replaced by the AS-90 in the early-mid-1990s.) Used in Operation Granby/Gulf War.
: Used by United States Army and United States Marine Corps, M110A2s retired in 1994.

See also
 List of U.S. military vehicles by model number
 2S7 Pion – Soviet L/55.3 203 mm self-propelled cannon
 2S4 Tyulpan – Soviet 240 mm self-propelled mortar
 List of crew served weapons of the US Armed Forces
 M55 – 203 mm self-propelled gun, predecessor to the M110
 M107 – a 175 mm self-propelled gun on the same chassis
 Sholef – Israeli 155 mm self-propelled howitzer
 T92 Howitzer Motor Carriage – a 240 mm howitzer M1 fitted on a M26 Pershing chassis

References

 TM 9-2350-304-10 dated October  1979

External links

fas.org.
globalsecurity.org
M110 Walk Arounds on Prime Portal
https://www.militaryfactory.com/armor/detail.asp?armor_id=59

Self-propelled artillery of the United States
Self-propelled howitzers of the United States
Tracked self-propelled howitzers
203 mm artillery
Military vehicles introduced in the 1960s